Robert Wigram may refer to:

Sir Robert Wigram, 1st Baronet
Sir Robert Fitzwygram, 2nd Baronet
Sir Robert Fitzwygram, 3rd Baronet (1813-1873), of the Wigram baronets